Best of Leæther Strip is a best-of compilation by Leæther Strip.

Track listing
 Japanese Bodies (Japanese Bodies)
 AntiUS (Psycho Strip Edit) (Solitary Confinement)
 Battleground (KGB Slam) (Body Rapture compilation)
 Leæther Strip II (Reanimated) (Aspects of Aggression)
 Strap Me Down (Solitary Confinement)
 Zyklon B (Science for the Satanic Citizen)
 Razor Blades (Go Berzerk) (The Pleasure of Penetration)
 Adrenalin Rush (Solitary Confinement)
 Nosecandy (Object V)
 Don't Tame Your Soul (Underneath the Laughter)
 No Rest for the Wicked (Legacy of Hate and Lust)
 Face of Evil
 Take the Fear Away

1996 greatest hits albums
Leæther Strip compilation albums